One True King is a 2020 fairytale fantasy by Soman Chainani. The final novel of The School for Good and Evil series and set after the events of A Crystal of Time, the book details Tedros', son of King Arthur, fight to become King of Camelot and prevent Japeth, who is impersonating his brother, from becoming the "One True King".

Plot
The book opens with Anadil, Hester, and Dot searching for Sophie. They are unaware that Sophie is being controlled, and that whenever she tries to remember her past she suffers immense pain. The trio discover something is wrong when they see that Sophie is about to get married to "Rhian" (who is actually his brother Japeth). 

Agatha and Tedros, meanwhile, have found King Arthur's ring that can keep the Storian alive, and they use Wish Fish to find Sophie. Sophie, being controlled, attempts to kill Agatha and Agatha realizes she must be under Japeth's control. Before the fight can truly become a large-scale war, Excalibur returns to the stone and King Arthur's voice informs everyone that there must be a contest to prove whether Tedros is king or Japeth is king; the winner will be king and the loser will be beheaded. Tedros also learns that Japeth and Rhian were not King Arthur's sons at all, but their true parents are still unknown.

Agatha, Tedros, Hort, and Nicola set off to help Tedros achieve the first test, and in doing so find a version of Merlin turned into a baby. Sophie, meanwhile, is on a hunt to find out more about her past despite the pain it gives her. She discovers the snake 'scims' that Japeth can create must be in her head, feeding on her memories, and uses her powers to painfully take them from her head and escapes. Hester, Anadil, and Dot, meanwhile, search for Dot's dad, who they believe may still be alive; Japeth catches up to Sophie as she in turn catches up to Tedros, Agatha, Hort, and Nicola. During a battle, it is discovered that Japeth is the son of Rafal, a villain in the previous story arc.

Eventually, after Tedros and Japeth complete more tests, the time comes for the winner to be selected. Japeth is selected, and Tedros is beheaded; however, Merlin revives Tedros and the results are shown to be a mistake, and Japeth is beheaded instead. Tedros and Agatha become King and Queen of Camelot, while Nicola and Hort break up and Sophie pursues a romantic relationship with him, and Anadil and Hester are hinted at being in a romantic relationship as well.

Development
Publisher HarperCollins promised answers to three questions:
 Who will sit on Camelot's throne and rule the Endless Woods?
 Who will be the One True King?
 What will come of Sophie and Agatha?

On August 22, 2019, the title was revealed to be One True King which Chainani cited as the only choice. The cover of the book was revealed on October 8, 2019, by Entertainment Weekly. Prior to its publication, a signed Barnes & Noble edition, featuring an exclusive poster and quiz was announced to be able to buy. The book was published on June 2, 2020.

Promotion
Chainani was initially set to do a 12-city tour to promote the book which was cancelled. Instead, virtual public events were held. For example, there was a game called Escape the School in which guests participate in a trivia exam about the books, with the highest scorer winning a Nintendo Switch. 150 children were given the chance to have five-minute video call with Chainani in a "golden ticket" event. The trailer for the book was published on April 14, 2020, on YouTube by EverNever TV.

Reception

Kirkus Reviews gave the book a positive review, praising the quests, epiphanies, backstory, conversations, concept of true love, and ending.

References

External links
 

2020 American novels
2020 children's books
2020 fantasy novels
American children's novels
American fantasy novels
Children's fantasy novels
Fiction about shapeshifting
HarperCollins books
Novels about magic
Novels set in fictional locations
Novels set in schools
Sequel novels
The School for Good and Evil